The Tarr Steps is a clapper bridge across the River Barle in the Exmoor National Park, Somerset, England.

A typical clapper bridge construction, the bridge's listing assesses it as medieval in origin. The stone slabs weigh up to two tons each. It has been designated by English Heritage as a grade I listed building and scheduled monument.

Nature reserve

Owned by Exmoor National Park Authority, Tarr Steps Woodland National Nature Reserve covers 33 hectares of the River Barle valley. This is mainly sessile oak (Quercus petraea) woodland, with beech (Fagus), ash, sycamore (Acer pseudoplatanus), hazel (Corylus), blackberry (Rubus), bluebells (Hyacinthoides non-scripta) and honeysuckle (Lonicera). It is internationally significant for the mosses, liverworts and lichens which flourish in the cool damp conditions. Much of the woodland was once coppiced, primarily to provide charcoal for the local iron smelting industry.  The river and the valley woodlands are part of the Barle Valley Site of Special Scientific Interest and abound with wildlife, ranging from red deer to dormice, including the rare Barbastelle Bat (Barbastella barbastellus) and otter that feed along the unpolluted and fast-flowing river.

Well marked footpaths run along the valley between Simonsbath and Dulverton and to the village of Withypool. Parking for the disabled and refreshments are available nearer the bridge, as are information panels put up by the Exmoor National Park, giving details of Tarr Steps history and design.

Bridge

Within the reserve is the scheduled monument Tarr Steps , a clapper bridge over the River Barle. The name "clapper bridge" comes from the Medieval Latin "claperius" which means "pile of stones". It is an ancient form of bridge constructed with large unmortared slabs of stone resting on one another; this is the largest example of its type. This is one of the best known monuments on Exmoor. Its age is unknown, as several theories claim that Tarr Steps dates from the Bronze Age but others date them from around 1400 AD. It has been restored several times in recent years, following flood damage. Over the years the damage provides a good indicator of the strength of each flood. Some of the top slabs have been washed away in extreme flood conditions and they have now all been numbered to facilitate replacement. The Exmoor National Park web site says

The bridge was badly damaged by floodwater on 22 December 2012 when steel wires upstream (designed to protect the bridge from damaging debris) were broken by fallen trees washed down the river. Floodwaters carried away part of the bridge again on 21 November 2016, and it has since been rebuilt.

See also

 List of Grade I listed buildings in West Somerset

References

External links

 Historic photos of Tarr Steps
Images of England record of Tarr Steps
 Megalithic Portal entry for Tarr Steps
 www.exmoor-nationalpark.gov.uk - information on Tarr Steps floods

Ancient trackways in England
Buildings and structures in West Somerset
Exmoor
History of Somerset
Bridges in Somerset
Grade I listed buildings in West Somerset
Archaeological sites in Somerset
Scheduled monuments in West Somerset
Pedestrian bridges in England
Stone bridges in the United Kingdom
Rebuilt buildings and structures in the United Kingdom
Bronze Age sites in Somerset
Grade I listed bridges